The New England Metal and Hardcore Festival was an annual festival held in Worcester, Massachusetts, United States. It was a weekend-long concert of heavy metal and hardcore punk bands along with a merchandising and promotional area for record labels and other vendors. It had been held in the Worcester Palladium since its inception in 1999.

Time line

1999 – NEMHF I 
GWAR, Morbid Angel, Isis, Manowar, Overkill, Napalm Death, Converge, Diecast, Deicide, Vital Remains, Gwar, Madball, Crossthread, Non Compos, God Stands Still

The headliners were Morbid Angel and Napalm Death on the 1st night, Gwar and Deicide on the 2nd night, and Manowar and Earth Crisis on the third night. It was originally supposed to be The Misfits instead of Manowar, which is why there was more hardcore on the third day, but The Misfits canceled their appearance, thereby placing Manowar as the replacement headliner.

2000 – NEMHF II 
Friday, February 11, 2000 – Machine Head, Six Feet Under, Reveille, Shadows Fall, Immolation, Skarhead, 7th Rail Crew, Hate Machine, Gangsta Bitch Barbie, Primer 55, Simple, Buried Alive, Rain Fell Within, 100 Demons, Unearth, Scrape, Sworn Enemy, 6 Thirty 7, Long Winter Stare, Havoc, Hateplow, Eastcide, Shed, R22, Colepitz, Nok, Hypnotic Kick, Dead Trees Sway, Morgan 2, Neck, Blindside, Trustfall

Saturday, February 12, 2000 – The Misfits, Cannibal Corpse, Hate Eternal, Snapcase, Vision of Disorder, Candiria, Reach The Sky, Isis, Indecision, Dillinger Escape Plan, Dying Fetus, Turmoil, Pessimist, Diecast, Grade, Dissolve, All That Remains, Drowning Man, Step Kings, Gargantua Soul, Internal Bleeding, Maudlin of the Well, Torn Assunder, Chimaira, Deceased, The Hope Conspiracy, Blood Has Been Shed, Diabolic, Himsa, Skinless, Killswitch Engage, Aftershock, Suffer, Old Man Gloom, Cannae, Catheter, Excoriate, Drag Body, Death Threat, In My Eyes, Ground Zero, Recoil band, Haste, Spite, Onslaught, Humans Being, God Dethroned, Toxic Field Mice, Delvic, Code 7, Crash Davis, In Pieces, Anal Cunt, Hatebreed

2001 – NEMHF III 
Cannibal Corpse, wasteform, Dimmu Borgir, Nile, The Haunted, Lamb of God, Malevolent Creation, Catastrophic (ex-Obituary), Monstrosity, Meshuggah, Amorphis, Opeth, Shadows Fall, Dying Fetus, Gorguts, God Forbid, Zao, Living Sacrifice, All Out War, Diecast, Skinless, Noctuary, All That Remains, Poison the Well, God Below, Exhumed, Cannae, The Hope Conspiracy, Killswitch Engage, Nullset, Blood Has Been Shed, and Vital Remains, Suffocation, Held Under, Mushmouth, Santa Sangre. Zircon

2002 – NEMHF IV 
In Flames, Cannibal Corpse, Nile, Shai Hulud, Overcast (reunion), Soilwork, Throwdown, Poison the Well, Lamb of God, Dark Funeral, Killswitch Engage, God Forbid, Pissing Razors, Arch Enemy, NORA, Suicide Note, All That Remains, deadeyesunder, Blood Audio (ex-Overkill), Burma, Crematorium, 1000 Falling Sky's, Vexation, Burnt by the Sun, Light Is the Language, Dasai, Severe Torture, Disavowed, Disgorge, Deeds of Flesh, Pig Destroyer, Deceased, Maudlin of the Well, Novembers Doom, Sky Came Falling, From Autumn to Ashes, Most Precious Blood, Devil May Care, Blood Has Been Shed, Misery Index, Scar Culture, Dim Mak, Kataklysm, 5.0, Barium

2003 – NEMHF V 
Opeth, Shadows Fall, Nevermore, Lacuna Coil, Kataklysm, Goatwhore, Novembers Doom, Noctuary, Full Blown Chaos, Beyond The Sixth Seal, Wasteform, Eviscerate, Blood Has Been Shed, DRI, Cannae, Bongzilla, Crematorium, Locked In A Vacancy, Scarlet, Grimlock, The Acacia Strain, Superjoint Ritual, Meshuggah, The Haunted, Suffocation, Lamb Of God, Converge, Killswitch Engage, Strapping Young Lad, Unearth, Eighteen Visions, Diecast, Speedkillhate, NORA, Bleeding Through, Beyond The Embrace, Chimaira, Harakiri, Drowning, Held Under, Dysrhythmia, Traumaside, Pig Destroyer, The Red Chord, Atreyu, Misery Index, Cephalic Carnage, Most Precious Blood, Mastodon, Hate Eternal, Baby Brown Eye, Caliban, Himsa, Premonitions Of War, 100 Demons, The Takeover, Uphill Battle, On Broken Wings and a special performance by Agoraphobic Nosebleed

2004 – NEMHF VI 
Killswitch Engage, Arch Enemy, Machine Head, God Forbid, Iced Earth, Children of Bodom, Downward Deception, Zao, Throwdown, Bleeding Through, A Perfect Murder, All My Sins, All That Remains, As I Lay Dying, The Autumn Offering, Between The Buried And Me, The Black Dahlia Murder, The Bled, Burnt By The Sun, Bury Your Dead, Byzantine, Cannae, Cattle Decapitation, Comeback Kid, Crematorium, Darkest Hour, Daughters, Deadwater Drowning, Diecast, Ed Gein, Embrace Today, Evergreen Terrace, Evergrey, Every Time I Die, Found Dead Hanging, From A Second Story Window, Full Blown Chaos, Glass Casket, The Judas Cradle, Kataklysm, Martyr AD, Misery Index, Misery Signals, Mortal Treason, Most Precious Blood, NORA, Pig Destroyer, The Red Chord, Reflux, Scar Culture, Scarlet, Since The Flood, Six Feet Under, Soilent Green, Speedkillhate, Terror, Through The Discipline, To The Grave, Twelve Tribes, Walls of Jericho, Watch them Die, What Weapons Bring War

2005 – NEMHF VII 
Hatebreed, Gizmachi, Unearth, Obituary, Nightwish (cancelled), Chimaira, Cryptopsy, Hell Within, King Diamond, Nile, Soilwork, A Life Once Lost, All Shall Perish, All That Remains, As I Lay Dying, Behemoth, Black Dahlia Murder, Blood Has Been Shed, Bury Your Dead, Dark Tranquillity, Darkest Hour, Evergreen Terrace, Full Blown Chaos, Glass Casket, Hypocrisy, If Hope Dies, Internal Bleeding, Ion Dissonance, It Dies Today, Kylesa, Maroon, Misery Signals, Nimic, Premonitions Of War, Pro-Pain, The Red Chord, Reflux, Remembering Never, Scurvy, Sonata Arctica, Stemm, Strapping Young Lad, The Acacia Strain, The Agony Scene, The Esoteric, The Killing, The Minor Times, Throwdown, Trivium, Winter Solstice, Mnemic, Cephalic Carnage, Origin,
Between the Buried and Me, Noctuary, Paria

2006 – NEMHF VIII 
A Love Ends Suicide, Bronx Casket Company, Burn in Silence, Byzantine, Cannae, DragonForce, Lacuna Coil, Gamma Ray, Hypersolid, Inked in Blood, Into Eternity, Kid Deposit Triumph, Light This City, Mercury Switch, Protest the Hero, Sanctity, Withered, Orphan Secks, Wolf, xDeathStarx, 3, Bloodlined Calligraphy, Born Victim, Cellador, Daughters, Doomriders, Folly, Goat Horn, Phoenix Mourning, The Miles Between, Torn Asunder, xLooking Forwardx, Yakuza, 100 Demons, Arch Enemy, At All Cost, Baby Bottom Smashers, Caliban, Chimaira, Embrace The End, Exodus, God Forbid, Hate Eternal, Immolation, Into the Moat, Ion Dissonance, On Broken Wings, Overcast, Butte Skratcha, Scars of Tomorrow, Since The Flood, Skinless, Suffocation, Terror, Colin of Arabia, Damnation AD, Death Threat, First Blood, Full Blown Chaos, Righteous Jams, Shoot To Kill, Spitfire, Sworn Enemy, The Human Abstract, The Jonbenét, Turmoil, Alarum, Arsis, A Life Once Lost, Hateblood, Between the Buried and Me, Dead to Fall, Demiricous, Haste The Day, If Hope Dies, Necrophagist, Nodes of Ranvier, Scarlet, Still Remains, The Absence, The Acacia Strain, The Black Dahlia Murder, The Red Chord, Through the Eyes of the Dead, Neckdeath, Cephalic Carnage, Ed Gein, From A Second Story Window, Ligeia, Ringworm, Suicide Silence, Today I Wait

2007 – NEMHF IX 
April 27, 2007

Behemoth, Dimmu Borgir, DevilDriver, Walls of Jericho, Kataklysm, 3 Inches of Blood, Still Remains, Skinless, The Devil Wears Prada, Atomic Six, 100 Demons, NORA, Despised Icon, Nachtmystium, xDEATHSTARx, Animosity, DÅÅTH, December Aeternalis, Merauder, Suicide Silence, Death Before Dishonor, Ligeia, Pale Horse, Kylesa, Bloodlined Calligraphy, Stick to Your Guns, Thy Will Be Done, Skeletonwitch, As Blood Runs Black, Beneath The Massacre, The Faceless, The Funeral Pyre.

April 28, 2007

Unearth, Cannibal Corpse, The Black Dahlia Murder, The Red Chord, Job for a Cowboy, Lizzy Borden, God Dethroned, Impious, Goatwhore, 3, Shai Hulud, Since the Flood, Demiricous, Cellador, Hallows Eve, Beyond The Embrace, Architect, Animosity, Psyopus, If Hope Dies, Gaza, Absence, Forever In Terror, Apiary, Sons of Azreal, Catalystic Confession,
The Destro, The Miles Between, The Network, Epicurean.

2008 – NEMHF X 
April 25, 2008

Megadeth, In Flames, Children of Bodom, Job for a Cowboy, High on Fire

April 26, 2008

Dimmu Borgir, Shadows Fall, Behemoth, Overkill (cancelled), The Acacia Strain, Hate Eternal, Kataklysm, Vital Remains, Heaven Shall Burn, As Blood Runs Black, Despised Icon, Animosity, Through The Eyes Of The Dead, Skeletonwitch, Monstrosity, Keep of Kalessin, The End, Ghost Inside, Municipal Waste, Disfear, First Blood, On Broken Wings, Sleeping Giant, Arsis, Soilent Green, From A Second Story Window (cancelled), Cold World (cancelled), Cockpunch, Trap Them, Veil of Maya, For the Fallen Dreams, Embrace The End

April 27, 2008

Ministry, Meshuggah, Divine Heresy (cancelled), Ensiferum, Turisas, Týr, Eluveitie, A Life Once Lost, Emmure, Vanna, Stick to Your Guns, Winds of Plague, Impending Doom, Born of Osiris, Unholy, Kid Deposit Triumph (cancelled before festival), Unexpect, After the Burial, The Classic Struggle, Shai Hulud, Full Blown Chaos, Punkmeat, Tony Danza Tap Dance Extravaganza, Hemlock, Thy Will Be Done, Ligeia, Since the Flood, Recon, xTyrantx, Stray from the Path, Waking the Cadaver, Sea of Treachery, With Dead Hands Rising, Arsonists Get All the Girls (added at last minute due to Kid Deposit Triumph dropoff)

2009 – NEMHF XI 
April 17, 2009

Main Stage presented by Metal Blade Records:
All That Remains, Between the Buried and Me, The Haunted, The Acacia Strain, Suffocation, August Burns Red, Napalm Death, Whitechapel, Kataklysm, Toxic Holocaust, After The Burial, Psycroptic, Burning Human, Sylosis, Merauder, Woe of Tyrants

2nd Stage presented by Prosthetic Records:
Cattle Decapitation, Veil Of Maya, Psyopus, Coliseum, Aggressive Dogs, The Miles Between, Decrepit Birth, Trap Them, xThe Warx, Architect, Withered, Bison B.C., Left To Vanish

Developing Artists Stage presented by Deathcote Records:
Within The Ruins, Rose Funeral, The Destro, Brother Von Doom, We Were Gentlemen, Conqueror, Surrounded By Teeth, Pictures Of Winter, Half Hearted Comeback, Shroud of Bereavement, When The Deadbolt Breaks, Underlying Truth, Mordisk

April 18, 2009

Main Stage presented by Metal Blade Records:
Lamb of God, As I Lay Dying, Children Of Bodom, God Forbid, Municipal Waste, Emmure, Winds Of Plague, All Shall Perish, Austrian Death Machine, iwrestledabearonce, Thy Will Be Done, The Ghost Inside, Book Of Black Earth, ABACABB, Landmine Marathon, The Crimson Armada, Suicide Silence(secret special guest), Acaro

2nd Stage presented by Prosthetic Records:
Have Heart, Terror, Shipwreck, Cold World, Trapped Under Ice, Cruel Hand, The Carrier, This Is Hell, Energy, Unholy, Grandpa Fist, Defeater, Dead Swans, Century (American band)

Developing Artists Stage presented by Deathcote Records:
Stray from the Path, Soldiers, Oceano, Catalepsy, The Gary Coleman Project, Conducting From The Grave, Half Hearted Comeback, Broadcast The Nightmare, Autumn Black, For Today, Black Teeth, This or the Apocalypse

2010 – NEMHF XII 

Friday, April 23 and Saturday, April 24.

April 23, 2010

Mastodon, Between the Buried and Me, Baroness, Cro Mags, Earth Crisis, Death Threat, Death Before Dishonor, Colin of Arabia, Doomriders, Thick As Blood, Black Pyramid, Nachtmystium (cancelled), Donnybrook, XTheWarX, Grave Maker, Valient Thorr, After The Burial, The Fall Of Troy, Mongoloids, Burning Empires, Monsters, Howl.

April 24, 2010

Cannibal Corpse, Amon Amarth, Job For A Cowboy, Whitechapel, Skeletonwitch, Eluveitie, The Red Chord, Municipal Waste, Impending Doom, Lecherous Nocturne, Tony Danza Tap Dance Extravaganza, Chelsea Grin, Abacabb, Arsonists Get All The Girls, Malefice, Swashbuckle, Cattle Decapitation, Acaro, Holy Grail, Disembodied, Cruel Hand, Reign Supreme, XTyrantX, Rose Funeral, Soul Control, Mother Of Mercy, Gaza, Across The Sun, Through The Eyes Of The Dead.

2011 – NEMHF XIII 

Thursday, April 14, Friday, April 15 and Saturday, April 16

April 14, 2011

Attack Attack, Memphis May Fire, Vanna, MyChildren MyBride, Our Last Night, Stray from the Path, Arsonists Get All the Girls, A Bullet For Pretty Boy, Lions Lions, Armor for the Broken, This or the Apocalypse, I, The Breather, Across the Sun, Too Late the Hero, Atilla, A Plea for Purging, Dr. Acula, The Crimson Armada, Legacy, Counterparts, Legion, An Early Ending, Capitals

April 15, 2011

Biohazard, Blood For Blood, Bury Your Dead, Terror, Winds of Plague, Stick to Your Guns, Your Demise, Thy Will Be Done, This is Hell, The Carrier, Suffokate, Born Low, Murder Death Kill, Trapped Under Ice, Lionheart, Shai Hulud, Close Your Eyes, Legend, Monsters, The World We Knew, The Great Commission, The Greenery, Hundredth, King Conquer, Betrayal, Withered, Venia, Death Ray Vision, She Has Fallen, Years Since the Storm

April 16, 2011

Main Stage:
Hatebreed, Between the Buried and Me, Born of Osiris, Darkest Hour (cancelled), Carnifex, Job For a Cowboy, Dying Fetus, Oceano, The Ocean, Cephalic Carnage, Tony Danza Tap Dance Extravaganza, Within the Ruins, The Contortionist, Volumes, Structures

Second Stage:
Skeletonwitch, 3 Inches of Blood, Nails, A Life Once Lost, Believer, Revocation, Withered, Lazarus A.D., Last Chance to Reason, Son of Aurelius, Legion, Hung, Wretched

2012 – NEMHF XIV 

Thursday, April 19, Friday, April 20, Saturday, April 21, and Sunday, April 22

April 19, 2012

Thy Will Be Done, Last Chance To Reason, The Confrontation, Forsaken, Eyes of the Dead, Strike Hard, Acaro, Conforza, Desiccation, Widow Sunday, Hivemasher

April 20, 2012

The Black Dahlia Murder, The Acacia Strain, Oceano, All Shall Perish, Obey The Brave, Nile, Skeletonwitch, Lionheart, Carnifex, Fleshgod Apocalypse, First Blood, Molotov Solution, The Contortionist, Reign Supreme (band), Conducting From The Grave, Fit For An Autopsy, Incendiary, Palehorse, Hour of Penance, Legion, Relentless, Pathogenic.

April 21, 2012

All That Remains, DragonForce, Overkill, Unearth, Iwrestledabearonce, Protest the Hero, Periphery, Bane, God Forbid, Shipwreck, Cruel Hand The Mongoloids, Structures (cancelled), System Divide, Naysayer, The Greenery, Diamond Plate, Rotting Out, Expire, Trumpet The Harlot, Manners, Malefice (cancelled), Suidakra, Cockpunch, Fire In The Skies, Wrong Answer, Revenge.

April 22, 2012

Killswitch Engage, Every Time I Die, Vanna, Emmure, For Today, Chelsea Grin, Sleeping Giant, Stick To Your Guns, Attila, On Broken Wings, Mychildren Mybride, For the Fallen Dreams, Texas In July, Upon A Burning Body, Volumes, Like Moths To Flames, Glass Cloud, Hundredth, No Bragging Rights, Counterparts, Gideon.

2013 – NEMHF XV 

Friday, April 19, Saturday, April 20, and Sunday, April 21

April 19, 2013

Disgrace, Antagonist AD, Rude Awakening, Suburban Scum, Twitching Tongues, Code Orange Kids, Expire, Power Trip, The Mongoloids, Xibalba, Death Before Dishonor, Trap Them, Lightsbane, Scalpel, Mutilation Rights, Allegaeon, Vygr, Holy Grail, Black Breath, Shadows Fall, Municipal Waste, Exodus, Every Time I Die, Hatebreed, Anthrax

April 20, 2013

Saving Grace, Those Who Fear, Ark of The Covenant, Dead By Wednesday, Mouth Of The South, East Beast, City In The Sea, Years Since The Storm, Reflections, Battlecross, Goatwhore, Murder Death Kill, Born Low, Alpha & Omega, Terror, Totality, Hellsot, trollfest, heidevolk, Fit For An Autopsy, Glass Cloud, Tyr, The Contortionist, Within The Ruins, After The Burial, Born Of Osiris, Ensiferum, Katatonia, The Dillinger Escape Plan, Opeth

April 21, 2013

To The Wind, Agitator, Brick By Brick, The Greenery, Warhound, Turnstile, Thick As Blood, Sworn In, incendiary, Gideon, Bracewar, Remembering Never, Trapped Under Ice, Welcome The Tide, Skylar, Dark Sermon, Beyond The Shore, Walking The Dead, Fit For A King, Erra, Legion, I Declare War, The Plot In You, Texas In July, Job For A Cowboy, Miss May I, D.R.I., Sick of It All, Suicidal Tendencies

2014 – NEMHF XVI 

April 17, 2014

All That Remains, Bleeding Through, Broken Hope, Cop Problem, Darkest hour, Emmure, Enabler, Fallujah, Gideon, InDirections, Julius Seizure, Kublai Khan, Oceano, Rivers of Nihil, Scars of Tomorrow, The Last Ten Seconds of Life, Years Since The Storm

April 18, 2014

1349, Behemoth, Bent Life, Black Crown Initiate, Born Low, Carnifex, Colin Of Arabia, Cruel Hand, Erra, Fire and Ice, Fit For An Autopsy, Goatwhore, I Declare War, Inquisition, Malfunction, Naysayer, Obey The Brave, Reflections, Slapshot, Suburban Scum, The Acacia Strain, The Mongoloids, Thy Art Is Murder, Warhound, Whitechapel, Within The Ruins

April 19, 2014

Menace, Terrible Minds, Sands, Madball, King Nine, Will to Die, Wisdom in Chains, Presence of Fear, Axis, Ante Up, Rude Awakening, Barricade, Dementor, City of Snakes, Heavyweight, Steel Nation, Step Up, Hatebreed, Up Your Arsenal, Greylines, Paper Trail, Incited, Lifeless, Empire of Rats, Comeback Kid, H2O, Blood For Blood, Death Before Dishonor, Remembering Never, Vice, 100 Demons, Floods, Bad Terms, The Storm, Strength For A Reason, Agitator, Not Til Death, Futile Justic

2015 – NEMHF XVII 

April 17, 2015

Wisdom In Chains, Terror, Code Orange, Overcast, H2O, Biohazard, Jasta, CDC, Agitator, Rock Bottom, Surge of Fury, Black Mask, Homewrecker, Eternal Sleep, Bane, Downpresser

April 18, 2015

E. Town Concrete, Exodus, Strengthen What Remains, Nails, Indecision, Incendiary, Suburban Scum, Incantation, Vital Remains, Allegaeon, Rivers of Nihil, World War 4, Wisdom in Chains, Disgrace, Gods Hate, Thy Will Be Done, Vice, No Zodiac, Extinction AD, Absolute Suffering, Nailbomb, Incite

April 19, 2015

Kid Dynamite, Strength For A Reason, The Color Morale, Vanna, Death Before Dishonor, Cruel Hand, Lionheart, The Plot in You, I Declare War, These Streets, My Ticket Home, Nasty, Rude Awakening, Lorna Shore, Gift Giver, The Last Ten Seconds of Life, Brick by Brick, World of Pain, Shark Ethic, Unity, Ghost Ship, Living Laser, Oath, Exalt, For Today, Motionless In White

2016 – NEMHF XVIII 

April 15, 2016
 Bury Your Dead
 Carnivora
 Disentomb
 Epicenter
 Fallujah
 Great American Ghost
 Left Behind
 Madball
 Merauder
 Oceano
 On Broken Wings
 Pathogenic
 River Black
 The Black Dahlia Murder
 The Days Ahead
 Traitors
 Varials
 Without Warning

April 16, 2016
 36 Crazyfists
 Currents
 Earth Crisis
 Exalt
 Ghost Key
 Hollow Earth
 Hope Before The Fall
 In Depths & Tides
 Inari
 Of Nations
 Jesus Piece
 Killswitch Engage
 Memphis May Fire
 Old Wounds
 Reflections
 Ringworm
 Toothgrinder
 Unearth
 Unlocking the Truth
 Wind Walkers
 Zao

DVD release 
 New England Metal Hardcore Festival 2003
 Trustkill Records
 EAN: 0824953005192

References

External links 
Homepage
MassConcerts' Scott Lee Follows up on NEMHF 2009
Live Photos of New England Metal Fest

Music festivals in Massachusetts
Hardcore punk
Heavy metal festivals in the United States